"Extravaganza" is the first single by American R&B artist Jamie Foxx, taken from his second album Unpredictable (2005). It features Kanye West. The song peaked at number 52 on US Hot R&B/Hip-Hop Songs chart in October 2005. The song also peaked at number 43 on the UK Singles Chart, becoming his first charting single on the chart as lead artist.

Background
"Extravaganza" was originally set to be the first single in Foxx's second album, Unpredictable, but was pushed back in favor of the title track. The track was one of the first songs leaked off the album before its release date, under the original title "One Night Extravaganza". However, the song was only released as a single in the UK and Australia in June 2006. A video was made for the song and was released in the UK. The video for "Extravaganza" is available to view on YouTube, however, the video does not feature Kanye West.

Track listings

UK CD single & Digital download
 "Extravaganza" (album version) (featuring Kanye West)
 "One Too Many Drinks (Extravaganza)"Feat Kanye west (video  version - with rap)
 "Extravaganza" (Shux remix)
 "Don't Know You Anymore

Official versions
 Extravaganza (Album Version) (feat. Kanye West (Extravaganza)"feat kanye west (video version - with rap) / ( Rap Version)
 Extravaganza ( Rap Version)
 Extravaganza (Shux Remix)

Charts

Release history

References

External links
Music video on YouTube
Source for UK single release date

2005 singles
Jamie Foxx songs
Kanye West songs
Music videos directed by Paul Hunter (director)
Songs written by Jamie Foxx
Songs written by Mike City
2005 songs